The discography of American metalcore band Ice Nine Kills consists of six studio albums, four EPs, one demo, seven singles and twenty-three music videos.

Albums

Studio albums

Demos

Live Albums

EPs

Singles

As lead artist

As featured artist

Other releases

Music videos

Collaborations

References 

Heavy metal group discographies
Post-hardcore group discographies
Discographies of American artists